Jacques Meslier (3 May 1928 – 25 January 2014) was a French water polo player. He competed in the men's tournament at the 1960 Summer Olympics.

References

1928 births
2014 deaths
French male water polo players
Olympic water polo players of France
Water polo players at the 1960 Summer Olympics
Sportspeople from Ho Chi Minh City